Blekinge Wing, also F 17 Kallinge, or simply F 17, is a Swedish Air Force wing with the main base located near Ronneby in southern Sweden.  It is one of the three remaining wings in Sweden and currently has two squadrons of multirole aircraft. F 17 in the south and F 21 in the north are the two wings remaining to have operational squadrons. F 7 is a school where pilots begin their training in the JAS 39 Gripen. After that the pilot's training is moved out to the two operational wings there they learn their final skills.

History
F 17 was established on the Bredåkra moor in 1944 under the name of Kungliga Blekinge Flygflottilj, The Royal Blekinge Air Wing. The moor had been used as a military training ground since the 19th century. The wing was at first mainly used for marine operations, such as torpedo and naval mine deployment. In 1947 the wing was reorganized with bomber squadrons. In 1954 the first jet planes entered service at the wing, as a part of the Swedish Air Force's transition to jet aircraft.

In 1973 another transition took place when F 17 received two squadrons with J 35 Draken from the former Östgöta Wing (F 3). From 1976 to 1978, F 17 was a pure "Air-to-air" fighter wing with the two squadrons of J 35 aircraft. In 1978 one of these was replaced with a modern reconnaissance squadron equipped with the then state-of-the-art SF/SH 37 Viggen aircraft. The remaining J 35 Draken squadron was replaced with JA 37 Viggen in 1982.

In 1993 the reconnaissance squadron was moved to the Scania Wing (F 10), and was replaced with a JA 37 squadron from the closed Bråvalla Wing (F 13). Once again F 17 became an air-to-air only wing. F 17 is since 2002 equipped with two squadrons of JAS 39 Gripen, as the old JA 37 Viggen aircraft is phased out.

F 17 today
Parts of the Swedish helicopter forces are today stationed at F 17 with antisubmarine warfare as their main task. A rescue helicopter is also stationed here.
F 17 has detachments on Gotland (F 17 G), on Malmen airport near Linköping (F 17 M) and in Hästveda, an urban area in the Hässleholm Municipality. The wing uses the coat of arms of Blekinge as the emblem.

Current fleet:
 JAS 39 Gripen
 Saab 105 (SK 60)
 Eurocopter Super Puma (HKP 10)
 NHIndustries NH90 (HKP 14)
 AgustaWestland AW109 (HKP 15)

Heraldry and traditions

Coat of arms
The first coat of arms of the Blekinge Wing was used from 1944 to 1994. Blazon: "Azure, the provincial badge of Blekinge, an oak, the trunk enfiled with three open crowns, all or." The current coat of arms has been used since 1994. Blazon: "Azure, the provincial badge of Blekinge, an oak, the trunk enfiled with three open crowns, a chief over a string, charged with a winged twobladed propeller, all or."

Colours, standards and guidons
Blekinge Wing presents one wing colour and one school colour.

Wing colour
The first colour was presented to the wing at Svea Air Corps (F 8) at Barkarby Airport by His Majesty the King Gustaf V on 17 September 1944. Blazon: "On blue cloth in the centre the badge of the Air Force; a winged two-bladed propeller under a royal crown proper, all in yellow. In the first corner the provincial badge of Blekinge; an oak enfiled with three open crown, all in yellow." Decor through inserting and embroidery.

A new colour was presented to the wing at Kallinge by His Majesty the King Carl XVI Gustaf on 15 April 2004. The colour is drawn by Kristina Holmgård-Åkerberg and embroidered by hand in insertion technique by the company Libraria. Blazon: "On blue cloth in the centre the badge of the Air Force; a winged two-bladed propeller under a royal crown proper. In the first corner the provincial badge of Blekinge; an oak enfiled with three open crowns; in the second corner the town badge of Kalmar; from a waved base a yellow tower embattled issuant between two mullets (a legacy from the former Kalmar Wing, F 12), in the third corner the provincial badge of Scania; an erazed head of a griffin with an open crown (a legacy from the former Scania Wing, F 10) and in the fourth corner an eagle, wings elevated and displayed, on its breast an escutcheon with a sinister-turned eagle (a legacy from the former Swedish Air Force Flying School, F 5). All décor in yellow."

School colour
The colour was originally presented to the then Swedish Air Force Flying School (F 5) by His Majesty the King Carl XVI Gustaf on 25 August 1996. The colour is drawn by Kristina Åkerberg and embroidered by machine in insertion technique by Engelbrektsson flag factory. The colour was used as school colour at the Scania Wing (F 10) from 1 July 1998 to 31 December 2002 and at the Uppland Wing (F 16) from 1 January 2003 to 31 December 2003. Blazon: "On blue cloth in the centre the badge of the Air Force; a winged two-bladed propeller under a royal crown proper. In the first corner an eagle, wings elevated and displayed, on its breast an escutcheon with a sinister-turned eagle. All décor in yellow."

March
The march "Torsten Rapp" composed by music director Carl Gustaf Ellström was used from 1946 to 1957. "Blekinge flygflottiljs marsch" composed by music director Åke Dohlin was established on 13 June 1984. The march was commissioned by F 17 in 1984 in connection with the wing's 40th anniversary.

Commanding officers

From 1944 to 1978, the commanding officers was referred to as flottiljchef ("wing commander"), and had during the wings first years the rank of lieutenant colonel. From 1947, the wing commander got the rank of colonel. From 1974 to 1981, the wing commander was referred to as sektorflottiljchef ("sector wing commander"). Unlike sector wing commanders at other wings, the sector wing commander at F 17 was not awarded the rank of senior colonel. From 1 July 1981, the commanding officer is again referred to as flottiljchef ("wing commander"), and had the rank of colonel.

Wing and sector wing commanders

1944–1948: Torsten Rapp
1948–1951: Hugo Svenow
1951–1963: Sten Rydström
1963–1966: Per Svensson
1966–1975: Carl-Otto Larsson
1975–1984: Erik Spångberg
1984–1987: Rolf Clementson
1987–1990: Gunnar Ståhl
1990–1998: Bo-Walter Eriksson
1998–2000: Lennart Pettersson
2000–2003: Lars Johansson
2003–2007: Lars Lundell
2007–2009: Niclas Karlsson
2009–2012: Mats Helgesson
2012–2013: Gabor Nagy
2014–2014: Magnus Liljegren
2014–2019: Lars Bergström
2019–2022: Tommy Petersson
2022–20xx: Anders Jönsson

Deputy sector wing commanders
In order to relieve the sector wing commander, a deputy sector wing commander position was added in 1978. Its task was to lead the unit procurement, a task largely similar to the old wing commander position. Hence he was also referred to as flottiljchef ("wing commander"). The deputy sector wing commander had the rank of colonel. On 30 June 1981, the deputy sector wing commander position was terminated, when the sector responsibility was transferred to the Scania Wing (F 10).

1978–1980: Sten Norrmo

Names, designations and locations

See also
 Swedish Air Force
 List of military aircraft of Sweden

Footnotes

References

Notes

Print

Web

Further reading

External links

Wings of the Swedish Air Force
Military units and formations established in 1944
Ronneby Municipality
1944 establishments in Sweden